Arquímedes José Figuera Salazar (born 6 October 1989 in Cumaná) is a Venezuelan international footballer who plays for César Vallejo as a midfielder.

Career
Figuera started his career with Cumaná based  Nueva Cádiz Fútbol Club. He joined later than to Fuguera, who was 2009 promoted to the seniorteam of Trujillanos.

International 
21 January 2009 takes for the U-20 of Venezuela and attended the Sudamericano Sub-20 in Venezuela.

Figuera has made 22 appearances for the Venezuela national football team since 2012.

International goals
Scores and results list Venezuela's goal tally first.

References

1989 births
Living people
People from Cumaná
Venezuelan footballers
Venezuela international footballers
Venezuelan Primera División players
Peruvian Primera División players
Trujillanos FC players
Deportivo La Guaira players
Club Deportivo Universidad César Vallejo footballers
Association football midfielders
Copa América Centenario players
2019 Copa América players
Venezuelan expatriate footballers
Expatriate footballers in Peru